Nim is a mathematical two player game.

Nim or NIM may also refer to:
 Nim (programming language)
 Nim Chimpsky, a signing chimpanzee

Acronyms
 Network Installation Manager, an IBM framework
 Nuclear Instrumentation Module
 Negative index metamaterial, a metamaterial which can direct and regulate wave propagation due to its negative refractive index
 Net interest margin, a measure of banking performance
 Nigerian Institute of Management, a professional association
 Nuclear Instruments and Methods in Physics Research, a scientific journal
 Diori Hamani International Airport (IATA code), Niamey, Niger

See also
 Nym (disambiguation)
 NIMH (disambiguation)
 NIMS (disambiguation)